Wurster is a surname. Notable people with the surname include:

Carl Wurster (1900–1974), German chemist
Catherine Bauer Wurster (1905–1964), American social housing pioneer
Charles D. Wurster, US Coast Guard admiral
Donald C. Wurster, US Air Force general
Frederick W. Wurster (1850–1917), last mayor of Brooklyn, New York
Jon Wurster (born 1966), American musician and comedian
William Wurster (1895–1973), American architect
Wolfgang W. Wurster (1937–2003), German researcher in the fields of architecture and archaeology

Occupational surnames